Frank Richard Fleming (December 11, 1953 – March 6, 2022) was an American politician who served as a member of the Montana House of Representatives from the 51st district. He was appointed to the House on January 30, 2018, succeeding Adam Rosendale.

Early life and education 
Fleming was born in Great Falls, Montana, on December 11, 1953, and graduated from Great Falls High School in 1972. He earned a Bachelor of Arts degree in education and political science and a Master of Education with an emphasis in public administration from Montana State University Billings, then known as Eastern Montana College.

Career 
Prior to entering politics, Fleming worked as a corrections officer for the Montana Department of Corrections. He was appointed to the Montana House of Representatives on January 30, 2018, succeeding Adam Rosendale.

Death 
In January 2022, Fleming announced he would not seek re-election that year for health reasons. He died after a long illness on March 6, 2022, at the age of 68.

References 

1953 births
2022 deaths
21st-century American politicians
American prison officers
Republican Party members of the Montana House of Representatives
Montana State University Billings alumni
Politicians from Great Falls, Montana